Víkurfréttir is the main newspaper of the Icelandic town of Keflavík.

The newspaper was founded in Southern Peninsula in August 1980. In 1983, it was bought by the current owner, Páll Ketilsson. It is a weekly but was for a while published twice a week.

References

External links
 Víkurfréttir website 

Weekly newspapers published in Iceland
Publications established in 1980
1980 establishments in Iceland
Mass media in Keflavík